Piano di Sorrento is a comune (municipality) in the Metropolitan City of Naples in the Italian region Campania, located about  southeast of Naples. Piano di Sorrento borders the following municipalities: Meta, Sant'Agnello, Vico Equense.

Victorian poet Robert Browning sojourned in the area and mentions the countryside of Piano and other localities of the Surrentine peninsula in the poem "The Englishman in Italy".

Economy

In the 19th-century, Piano di Sorrento's economy was based mainly on fishing, agriculture and shipbuilding activities. At the beginning of the 20th-century, Piano di Sorrento encountered socio-economic mutation which will - given by the progressive crisis of agriculture, shipbuilding and by the growing role of trade and tourism. During the 20th-century Piano di Sorrento increased its productivity thanks to the power supply and water supply for homes and the development of a connecting track between Sorrento and Castellammare di Stabia, made at first by a tram service, after provided by a train.

Twin towns
 Schwarzheide, Germany
 Cáceres, Spain

See also
Sorrentine Peninsula
Amalfi Coast

References

External links

 Piano di Sorrento 
 Piano di Sorrento Interactive Map
 History and tradition at Piano di Sorrento

Cities and towns in Campania
Coastal towns in Campania